Parthenopea is a genus of parasitic barnacles in the family Parthenopeidae, the sole genus of the family. There are at least three described species in Parthenopea.

Species
These species belong to the genus Parthenopea:
 Parthenopea australis Lützen, Glenner & Lörz, 2009
 Parthenopea reinhardi Boyko & Williams, 2020
 Parthenopea subterranea Kossmann, 1874

References

Barnacles